Makumeke (Xitsonga, "one who is found") is a small village in the Thulamela local municipality, approximately 9 km (5.6 miles) from Malamlele Township in northern South Africa.

Geography 
Makumeke is near or on five rivers: the large Rivhubye River, the intermittent river Ngholombi and rivulets Sanavi, Hlantswatindyelo and Mitlhwari. The latter three flow through the community's north side.

Demographics 
Makumeke has a population of 1,429 people based on the 2011 census. The population is made up of 804 Females and 625 males. 99.79% of the population are Black African and 0.21% are white. The main language spoken here is Xitsonga.

Facilities 
Makumeke consists of residences, a primary school, a daycare, a general store, a cafe and several spaza shops.  The village has running water and electricity.

Economy 
Makumeke suffers from high unemployment. Most of its families live below the poverty line.

References

Populated places in the Thulamela Local Municipality